Crabeth  is a surname. Notable people with the surname include:

 Adriaen Pietersz Crabeth (1510–1553), Dutch glass painter
 Dirk Crabeth (1501–1574), Dutch glass painter, tapestry designer, and mapmaker
 Wouter Crabeth I (1510–1590), Dutch glass painter
 Wouter Crabeth II (1594– 1644), Dutch painter